Simon Walker (24 January 1958 – 26 February 2004) was a British historian of late-medieval England. Born in Kuala Lumpur, Malaysia, he was educated at Charterhouse School and Magdalen College, Oxford. He was awarded a Prize Fellowship of All Souls College, Oxford where he completed his D.Phil thesis on John of Gaunt. In 1984 he was appointed to a lectureship at the University of Sheffield, and was subsequently promoted to Reader. In 1999 he was appointed a vice-warden of All Souls and gained an Extraordinary Research Fellowship at the College.

Walker's work focused on late-medieval political history, more specifically on the relations between nobles and retainers within the framework often referred to as bastard feudalism. His best-known work, The Lancastrian Affinity, 1361–1399 (1990), explored the retinue of John of Gaunt. Walker died of cancer in 2004.

Publications

Private Indentures for Life Service in Peace and War 1278-1476 (with Michael Jones). Office of the Royal Historical Society, University College London. 1994

References

1958 births
2004 deaths
People from Kuala Lumpur
People educated at Charterhouse School
Alumni of Magdalen College, Oxford
Academics of the University of Sheffield
British medievalists
Deaths from cancer in England
Fellows of All Souls College, Oxford